Michael Schäffer (born 28 April 1968) is a German curler from Neunburg vorm Wald. Schäffer competed in the 1988 Winter Olympics (demonstration event) and in the 1998 Winter Olympics for the Andy Kapp team. Surprising many, at the 1997 Ford World Men's Curling Championship the team placed second.

References

External links
 
 Video: 

1968 births
Living people
German male curlers
Olympic curlers of Germany
Curlers at the 1988 Winter Olympics
Curlers at the 1998 Winter Olympics
European curling champions
People from Schwandorf (district)
Sportspeople from the Upper Palatinate